Anoncia sphacelina is a moth in the family Cosmopterigidae. It was described by Keifer in 1935. It is found in North America, where it has been recorded from California.

Adults have been recorded on wing from March to June.

The larvae feed on Lepechinia calycina.

References

Natural History Museum Lepidoptera generic names catalog

Moths described in 1935
Cosmopteriginae
Moths of North America